Harry Edward Lang (December 29, 1894 – August 5, 1953) was an American actor who appeared in The Cisco Kid. He was known for working at the Metro-Goldwyn-Mayer cartoon studio.

Biography
Lang was born on December 29, 1894, in New York City. He made his film debut in the 1929 Vitaphone short, Who's Who?, in which he and partner Bernice Haley performed an early version of Who's on First? Lang and Haley also performed in a 1930 comedy skit named "Who's Your Boss?".

He provided vocal effects for Tom in the Tom and Jerry cartoons from 1940 to 1953, and occasionally did the speaking voice for Tom from 1943 to 1946.

In 1946, he was cast as Pancho in The Cisco Kid radio series, opposite Jack Mather in the title role.

Death
In 1953, Lang fell ill with heart trouble and was forced to leave The Cisco Kid. After a brief return to the show, he died from a heart attack on August 5, 1953, at his home in Hollywood, California. Mel Blanc replaced him as Pancho until the series ended in 1956.

Filmography

Film

Radio

References

External links 

1894 births
1953 deaths
20th-century American male actors
American male radio actors
American male voice actors
Male actors from New York City
Metro-Goldwyn-Mayer cartoon studio people
Walter Lantz Productions people
Animal impersonators